Eileen Welsome (born March 12, 1951) is an American journalist and author. She received a Pulitzer Prize for National Reporting in 1994 while a reporter for The Albuquerque Tribune for a 3-part story titled "The Plutonium Experiment" published beginning on November 15, 1993. She was awarded the prize for her articles about the government's human radiation experiments conducted on unwilling and unknowing Americans during the Cold War. Welsome also has received a George Polk Award, the Selden Ring Award for Investigative Reporting, an Investigative Reporters and Editors Gold Medal, the Heywood Broun Award, as well as awards from the National Headliners Association and the Associated Press. In 1999, Welsome wrote the book The Plutonium Files: America's Secret Medical Experiments in the Cold War. In 2000, Welsome received the PEN/Martha Albrand Award for First Nonfiction and the PEN Center USA West Award in Research Nonfiction for The Plutonium Files.

Welsome began her career in journalism as a reporter for the Beaumont Enterprise. She also worked for the San Antonio Light and the San Antonio Express-News  before joining The Albuquerque Tribune staff in 1987. Welsome graduated from the University of Texas at Austin in 1980 with a Bachelor of Journalism degree.

Bibliography
Welsome, Eileen. The Plutonium Files: America's Secret Medical Experiments in the Cold War. New York, N.Y.: Dial Press, 1999.  
Welsome, Eileen. The General and the Jaguar: Pershing's Hunt for Pancho Villa: a True Story of Revolution and Revenge. New York: Little, Brown and Co, 2006.  
Welsome, Eileen. Healers and Hellraisers: Denver Health's First 150 Years. Denver, CO: Denver Health Foundation, 2011. 
Welsome, Eileen. Deep Roots: AspenPointe and Colorado Springs, Together Since 1875. 2013.  
Welsome, Eileen. Dream Delivered: The Community Health Center Movement in Denver. 2016.

See also
 Human experimentation in the United States
Albert Stevens

References

External links
 Welsome discusses The General and the Jaguar at the Pritzker Military Museum & Library
The Plutonium Files: America’s Secret Medical Experiments in the Cold War 
Federal Radiation Testing

Pulitzer Prize for National Reporting winners
American women journalists
Moody College of Communication alumni
1951 births
Living people
20th-century American journalists
20th-century American women
21st-century American women